Dutton's river snail also known as the helmet rocksnail, scientific name Lithasia duttoniana,  is a species of freshwater snails with an operculum, aquatic gastropod mollusks in the family Pleuroceridae.  This species is endemic to the United States.

References 

Molluscs of the United States
Pleuroceridae
Gastropods described in 1841
Taxonomy articles created by Polbot